Men's Giant Slalom World Cup 1968/1969

Final point standings

In Men's Giant Slalom World Cup 1968/69 the best 3 results count.

Men's Giant Slalom
FIS Alpine Ski World Cup men's giant slalom discipline titles